Robert Landers (born January 6, 1944) is an American cattle farmer and golfer who gained fame in 1995 by playing on the Senior PGA Tour.

From Azle, Texas, Landers took up golf at the relatively late age of 28. Despite an unorthodox swing, a preference for playing in sneakers instead of golf shoes, and using golf clubs that he assembled himself, Landers became a popular figure by making the Senior PGA Tour (now called the Champions Tour) after receiving his card at qualifying school, and was followed by fans who called themselves the "Moo Crew." He played on the tour in 1995 and 1996. His best finish was a T-14 at the 1996 Kroger Senior Classic.

Befitting his image, Landers was sponsored by the workclothes manufacturer Dickies.

References
Murphy, Austin. "Moo Debut." Sports Illustrated, Feb 13, 1995. Available online at http://vault.sportsillustrated.cnn.com/vault/article/magazine/MAG1006226/1/index.htm.

External links

American male golfers
PGA Tour Champions golfers
Golfers from Texas
People from Azle, Texas
1944 births
Living people